A spetum is a pole weapon that was used in Europe during the 13th century. It consists of a pole, some 6–8 feet long, on which is mounted a spear head with two projections at its base. Many variations of this design flourished over time; some feel that the ranseur is a variation of the spetum. Other names include chauve souris, corseca, corsèsque, korseke, runka, and rawcon. The spetum is usually distinguished from the ranseur and partisan by its "prongs" being single edged and used for slashing. The main blade is 12–14 inches long, and the side blades are only about half that length and are set at acute angles.

The design of a spetum is for combat. The main blade is long enough to destroy any significant organ in the human body with a thrust. The side blades could bind weapons, similar to a jitte or sai. The blunt backs of the side blades give the spetum a variety of uses such as tripping and knocking aside shields while providing far more strength to the sharpened side and points than is possible with a dual-edged construction.

Polearms